LKG (an initialism for Lalgudi Karuppiah Gandhi) is a 2019 Indian Tamil-language political satire film produced by Ishari K. Ganesh and directed by K. R. Prabhu in his directorial debut. The film stars RJ Balaji and Priya Anand while Nanjil Sampath, J. K. Rithesh, Ramkumar Ganesan and Mayilsamy play supporting roles. Leon James scored music for the film, while Vidhu Ayyanna and Anthony handled the cinematography and editing, respectively. The film released on 22 February 2019 to unanimously positive reviews and performed well in the box office.

Plot 
The film begins with newly elected Lalgudi Karupaiah Gandhi (LKG) swearing in as Chief Minister (CM) of Tamil Nadu, where he is shot in the chest by a sniper.

The story moves back to six months ago where LKG is a mere councillor from Lalgudi ward in Trichy rural and belongs to the ruling party. LKG aspires to quickly achieve big in politics, unlike his father Azhagu Meiyappan, who neither achieved fame as a politician nor made money. The incumbent CM and ruling party chief, Avudaiyappan Mudhaliar, falls ill and gets hospitalised, while Bojappan, the party general secretary, becomes the interim CM. Since Avudayappan is the MLA from Lalgudi, LKG decides to put all efforts to contest in the by-election on behalf of the ruling party, once Avudaiyappan dies.

However, LKG feels that he needs to create some media visibility to get into Bojappan's good books. LKG gets the paid help of Sarala Munusamy aka Sara M. Samy, an employee of V Analytica – a multinational company which is involved in election strategy formulation. LKG goes to Delhi to protest and create an awareness against diseases, which gets the media's attention. Finally, LKG gets Bojappan's attention and meets him at party HQ in Daryaganj. Within a week, Avudaiyppan dies, Bojappan becomes the official Chief Minister, and a by-election is scheduled in Lalgudi constituency. Bojapan urgently announces that LKG is the by-election candidate at the party's general body meeting. Most of the party members and ministers do not agree with Bojappan's decision.

The ruling party's deputy-General secretary Ramraj Pandian, who was in USA when Avudayappan died, comes to the meeting hall. He is furious and feels betrayed by Bojappan's actions. He reminds him that he had been elected as MLA from Lalgudi, his hometown, in a hat trick in last 17 years, and only relinquished the seat due to Avudayappan's personal request in the previous general election.  He announces that he will contest in the election as an independent candidate, and once he wins, Bojappan will be expelled from the party and government, while he becomes the new CM.

Now, LKG realises the hardships of contesting in the elections. He understands that people are in favour of Ramraj due to his strong influence, hard work, caste and image. Also most of the state ministers, ruling party bigwigs, and MLAs do not work for LKG as they want to remain neutral to join the victor of the by-election. LKG devises a strategy to tarnish Ramraj's image with the help of meme creators and his sidekicks. He spreads rumours that Ramraj is actually a woman disguised as man, which results in the public trolling Ramraj on social media. Ramraj is also insulted when he is unable to sing "Tamil Thai Valthu" during a college function. Ramraj discovers that V Analytica is behind LKG and strikes a deal with Sara to support him.

Per Sara's advice, Ramraj goes to Delhi and meets national ruling party leaders. He also tries to break the ruling party of Tamil Nadu and prevent Bojappan from trying to take all the party MLAs to a resort. It is revealed that Sara was actually pretending to be on Ramraj's side. She comes back to help LKG, but a tussle comes within the party, while some party senior leaders do not want LKG to gain fame. However, Bojappan is in favour of LKG. During election, LKG wins against Ramraj, but Bojappan gets arrested in corruption cases, and LKG becomes the CM-elect of the state, due to Bojappan's efforts. The next morning, LKG is at the podium to be sworn-in, where he is shot.

The flashback ends, and now it is revealed that LKG was wearing a bulletproof vest during the swearing-in ceremony upon anticipating such an incident. The sniper is a youngster who aspires to some new-gen honest politicians. LKG speaks in front of the media that he is in to bring a change and that he has transferred the corruption cases against Bojappan to the CBI. He also delivers a message that there are numerous educated youngsters contesting in elections independently with a hope of bringing a change but go unnoticed by the public due to big political parties staying in the limelight. The sniper is convinced now, and the entire state believes that LKG will bring some good to the state, unlike other politicians. In the end, Sara smiles upon seeing LKG, which implies that he is just becoming a corrupt politician through his speech trying to woo public which was her strategy as well to win the hearts of people. Also, LKG silently reveals that he never intends to bring Bojappan out of prison.

Cast 

 RJ Balaji as Lalgudi Karupaiah Gandhi (LKG), a ward councillor who contests in a by-election as a candidate to become an MLA later he become Chief minister
 Priya Anand as Sarala Munusamy (Sara M. Samy), a V Analytica employee and political strategist who helps LKG in his purpose, later she develops her feelings for him.
 Nanjil Sampath as Azhagu Meiyappan, LKG's father
 J. K. Rithesh as Ramraj Pandian (Pandiamma), an MLA and LKG's opponent who is from the same ruling party
 Ramkumar Ganesan as Bojappan, the party secretary who becomes the interim CM and later gets arrested
 Mayilsamy as LKG's uncle
 Ananth Vaidyanathan as Avudaiyappan Mudhaliar, a deceased and former CM who has a by-election scheduled in his constituency
 Varun as Sniper (cameo), a youngster who shoots LKG
 Santhana Bharathi as Politician
 Manobala as Mukesh  
 Vinodhini Vaidyanathan as Bhagya Rajappan
 Bijili Ramesh as Drunkard
 Radha Manaalan "Kichdy" Randy as Sukumaran
 Redin Kingsley as Ramraj Pandian's younger brother who teaches him the Thamizh Thaai Vaazhthu

Production 
The film announcement was made during February 2018 by debutant director K. R. Prabhu, who previously worked as an associate of Prabhu Deva. K. R. Prabhu was the son of producer K. Rajan, and had previously worked as an actor in films including Aval Paavam (2000). The filmmakers hired RJ Balaji to play the lead role as Lalgudi Karuppiah Gandhi in the film, in fact making his first main lead role in a film. It was reported that RJ Balaji himself has written the story and screenplay, while two other technical writers, Era Murukan and Pradeep Rangananthan, were recruited for writing the dialogues; the final script is credited to "RJ Balaji & friends". The film was officially announced in May 2018. It was reported that the story is based on the Kannada  political satire film Humble Politician Nograj (2018).

Soundtrack

The soundtrack and background score for LKG is composed by Leon James. The album features six songs with lyrics contributed by Pa. Vijay, Vignesh Shivan, Ko Sesha, Thanjai N. Ramaiah Dass and Manonmaniam Sundaram Pillai. The audio rights were acquired by Think Music. Leon had reinterpreted the song "Ethanai Kaalam Dhaan" from the MGR-starrer Malaikkallan (1954), featuring additional lyrics by Ko Sesha and released it as single on the Republic Day, 26 January 2019, under the Saregama record label, which bought the original rights of the song. The remix version was sung by Sean Roldan. The second single, "Thimiru Kattaadha Di", which was penned by Vignesh Shivan and sung by Sathyaprakash, was released on 7 February 2019. The soundtrack album consists of other four songs were released on 9 February 2019, during the Final T20 match between India and New Zealand, which was aired on Star Sports Tamil, where the lead actor RJ Balaji, holding on the commentary. The lyrical video of, "Tamizh Anthem", was released by Anirudh Ravichander on 20 February 2019, coinciding with World Mother Tongue Day. The song was penned by Pa. Vijay and rendered by Sid Sriram and Chinmayi, along with veteran artists P. Susheela, L. R. Eswari, and Vani Jayaram. The song features elements of "Thamizh Thaai Vaazhthu" written by Manonmaniam Sundaram Pillai, which was separately included in the soundtrack album.

Release
The film was earlier scheduled to release on Pongal festival, clashing with Rajinikanth-starrer Petta and Ajith Kumar-starrer Viswasam, however the release was postponed. The theatrical rights of the film in Tamil version was sold to Sakthi Film Factory, and the theatrical rights of the film in Karnataka were sold to ANK Films. The film was released on 22 February 2019.

Marketing 
The announcement of the film was done on Star Sports Tamil after a huge buzz created by the team painting street walls stating RJ Balaji's entry into politics. The film is one of the few to have multiple brands as sponsors, including Nippon Paint and Ponvandu Detergents. A dedicated team worked on the marketing and promotions of the film right from the scripting phase till release. The release date was officially announced by the team on 11 February 2019 from the #BlueRoom at Twitter Headquarters, Mumbai, India. It is notable that this is the first south Indian film to use the Twitter #BlueRoom for announcement of release date of movie.

Home media 
The satellite rights of the film were sold to Sun TV. The film had its television premiere on 14 April 2019, with the Tamil New Year Day at 11:00 a.m. IST.

Reception 
LKG has released to a strong opening in Tamil Nadu with significant occupancy in all screens in metro areas. The movie received generally positive reviews from audience and critics. While M. Suganth of The Times of India praised that this is a "Satisfying political satire film and in-arguably the best of recent politics based movies", Subhakeerthana of Indianexpress notes that in spite of it being a "crowd-pleaser", "the story doesn’t rise above spoofing the clichéd political characters and situations".

References

External links 
 

2019 films
2010s Tamil-language films
Indian political satire films
Indian political comedy films
2010s political comedy films
2019 directorial debut films
2010s political satire films